La Fondation Calvet is an art foundation in Avignon, France, named for Esprit Calvet, who left his collections and library to it in 1810.  The foundation maintains several museums and two libraries, with support from the town.  The original legacies of paintings, archaeological items, coins and medals, and medieval sculpture have been added to by many other legacies, and a significant deposit of works of art from the Louvre.  The archaeological collections and medieval sculpture are now housed separately in the "Musée Lapidaire" - once the chapel of the Jesuit College.  The main museum is in an 18th-century city mansion, to which modern buildings have been added; the Library bequeathed by Calvet, and the important collection of over 12,000 coins and medals, have moved to a different location in the city.

The foundation has changed its name on several occasions. It was initially called the "Bibliothèque Calvet", then the "Museum Calvet", then "Musée Calvet", and since 1985 the "Fondation Calvet". The foundation now manages seven museums, two libraries, and an important collection of coins and medals.

In Avignon:
 Bibliothèque Calvet, the main library, housed since 1986 in part of what was once a cardinal's palace, the Livrée Ceccano
 Musée Calvet, the main art gallery, housed in an 18th-century city mansion (a hôtel particulier), the Hôtel de Villeneuve-Martignan
 Médaillier Calvet, a collection of coins and medals
 Musée Lapidaire, a collection of sculptures and archeological finds, housed in what was once the chapel of a Jesuit college
 Museum et Bibliothèque Requien, a natural history museum
Musée du Petit Palais, a collection of medieval and renaissance paintings

In Cavaillon, 25 km southeast of Avignon:

 Musée Archéologique de l'Hôtel-Dieu
 Musées Jouve et Juif Comtadin

Local painters, including Pierre Parrocel and the Mignard family, are especially well represented, as is Hubert Robert. Other  painters include Josse Lieferinxe, Giorgio Vasari, Luca Giordano, Salvator Rosa, Frans Francken the Younger, Jan Brueghel the Younger, Sebastiano Ricci, Giovanni Paolo Pannini, Joseph Vernet, Jacques-Louis David, Alexis Leon Louis Valbrun, Elisabeth Vigée-Lebrun, Théodore Géricault, Honoré Daumier, Camille Corot, Édouard Manet, Alfred Sisley, Maurice de Vlaminck and Chaïm Soutine.

References

Further reading



External links
Fondation Calvet
Musée Calvet in Avignon
Musée du Petit Palais in Avignon
Musée Archéologique de l'Hôtel-Dieu in Cavaillon
Musées Jouve et Juif Comtadin in Cavaillon
Numismatic collection in Avignon

Former private collection in France
1811 establishments in France